Sevastos Leontiadis was a Greek educationist who was most known as the director of the Kastoria school between 1726 and 1728.

He was born in Kastoria on 1690. He was student of Methodios Anthrakites in Siatista, Kastoria and Ioannina. He spent some time in Italy for studies. He was the director of the Kastoria school (1726–1728) and later taught in Kozani (1728–1733) and finally at the New Academy of Moschopolis. He died in 1765.

See also
List of Macedonians (Greek)

References

External links 
List of Great Macedonians (15th–19th century)

Greek educational theorists
1690 births
1765 deaths
Greek Macedonians
People of the Modern Greek Enlightenment
Macedonia under the Ottoman Empire
People from Kastoria
18th-century Greek educators